Pez is a brand of candy.

Pez, the Spanish word for fish, may also refer to:

Pez, an identifier of human gene PTPN14
Pez-e Olya ("Upper Pez"), a village in Iran
Pez-e Sofla ("Lower Pez"), a village in Iran
Pez-e Vosta ("Middle Pez"), a village in Iran
Barbadillo del Pez, a municipality located in the province of Burgos, Castile y León, Spain
Château de Pez, a Bordeaux wine estate
Château Les Ormes-de-Pez, a Bordeaux wine estate
Penza Airport (IATA: PEZ)
 Pez Card Game
 Pezcore and The Pez Collection, albums by US Ska punk group Less Than Jake

People:
 Pez (musician), Australian hip hop artist
 Andrés de Pez (1657 - 1723), Spanish Naval commander and founder of Pensacola, Florida
 Bernhard Pez ( 1683 - 1735), Austrian Benedictine historian and librarian
 Hieronymus Pez (1685 - 1762), Austrian Benedictine historian and librarian
 Johann Christoph Pez (1664-1716), German composer
 Ramiro Pez, Argentine-Italian rugby union footballer
 PE'Z, Japanese jazz band.
 Pezz, the original name of Canadian pop-punk band Billy Talent.

Other:
 "Hombre pez" or Fish-man of Lierganes, from the mythology of Cantabria, Spain
 El Pez que Fuma, a 1977 Venezuelan film
 "The Pez Dispenser", an episode of the comedy TV series Seinfeld
 .pez, the computer filename extension for Prezi files
 The Protocols of the Elders of Zion, a fabricated antisemitic text